Germany competed at the 1993 World Championships in Athletics in Stuttgart, Germany from 13 to 22 August 1993. The German Athletics Association nominated  athletes.

Medalists

Results

Men
Track and road events

Field events

Combined events – Decathlon

Women
Track and road events

Field events

Combined events – Heptathlon

References

Nations at the 1993 World Championships in Athletics
World Championships in Athletics
Germany at the World Championships in Athletics